The 2011–12 season was Swansea City's third season in the first tier of English football, and their first return to top-flight football since 1983. During the 2010–11 season, Swansea finished in 3rd place and beat Reading 4–2 in the Championship play-off final, to win promotion to the Premier League. In doing so, they became the first Welsh team to enter the Premier League. Swansea finished the season at 11th place after beating Liverpool 1–0 in the last game of the season on 13 May 2012. Safety was already confirmed two weeks prior when the Swans drew 4–4 with Wolverhampton Wanderers on 28 April 2012, a game Swansea had led 4–1, although Andrea Orlandi posted the fastest goal of the season in that match.

Players

Squad
Updated 13 May 2012.

On loan players during the season

Transfers

Transfers in

Transfers out

Loans in

Loans out

New contracts

Season statistics

Premier League table

Results summary

League performance

Statistics

Goals and appearances

Left club mid-season

Top scorers
Includes all competitive matches. The list is sorted by shirt number when total goals are equal.

{| class="wikitable" style="font-size: 95%; text-align: center;"
|-
!width=15|
!width=15|
!width=15|
!width=15|
!width=150|Name
!width=80|Premier League
!width=80|FA Cup
!width=80|League Cup
!width=80|Total
|-
|1
|10
|FW
|
|Danny Graham
|12
|2
|0
|14
|-
|2
|11
|LW
|
|Scott Sinclair
|8
|0
|0
|8
|-
|3
|42
|MF
|
|Gylfi Sigurðsson
|7
|0
|0
|7
|-
|4
|12
|RW
|
|Nathan Dyer
|5
|1
|0
|6
|-
|5
|24
|MF
|
|Joe Allen
|4
|0
|0
|4
|-
|6
|19
|FW
|
|Luke Moore
|2
|1
|0
|3
|-
|7
|18
|FW
|
|Leroy Lita
|2
|0
|0
|2
|-
|8
|2
|CB
|
|Ashley Williams
|1
|0
|0
|1
|-
|=
|8
|LW
|
|Andrea Orlandi
|1
|0
|0
|1
|-
|=
|15
|MF
|
|Wayne Routledge
|1
|0
|0
|1
|-
|=
|22
|FB
|
|Àngel Rangel
|0
|1
|0
|1
|-
|colspan="4"|
|Own goals
|1
|0
|1
|2
|-
|colspan="4"|
|Totals
|44
|5
|1
|50

Captains
Accounts for the Premier League only.

Starting formations
Accounts for Premier League formations only.

Fixtures & results

Pre-season friendlies

Mid-season friendlies

Premier League

FA Cup

League Cup

References

Swansea City A.F.C. seasons
Swansea City
Swansea City